Wake Island is a 1942 American action drama war film directed by John Farrow, written by W. R. Burnett and Frank Butler, and starring Brian Donlevy, Robert Preston, Macdonald Carey, Albert Dekker, Barbara Britton, and William Bendix. The film tells the story of the United States military garrison on Wake Island and the onslaught by the Japanese following the attack on Pearl Harbor.

Wake Island was nominated for four Academy Awards, including Outstanding Motion Picture.

The film shows how the Marines, after being pounded for days by Japanese aircraft, caught the Japanese invasion by complete surprise by unleashing a wall of fire that stopped the first attempt by the Japanese to land on the island. The next attack was successful in part because communications between the Marines had been cut, leading the Marine commander to believe his three hundred marines were being slaughtered by the over three thousand Japanese invaders. As a result of the fierce defense of the island and that a Japanese cruiser was sunk, Marines were beheaded on the way to Japan to work as slaves in the mines in Japan.

Plot
A map is shown with a voiceover giving a brief history of the United States military on Wake Island to November 1941. U.S. Marine Corps Major Geoffrey Caton departs Pearl Harbor naval base in Hawaii aboard the Pan American Clipper to take over command on Wake Island. A military contractor, Mr. McClosky, is also going there. The two clash during the flight.

Upon arrival, Caton inspects the island and identifies Privates Randall and Doyle as troublemakers. He has them dig a large slit trench by hand. McClosky has a construction contract for large trenches and living quarters, and drives his crew to complete the work on time. There are numerous conflicts between the military and the civilians, including practicing for air raids.

The next day is Sunday, December 7, 1941. Randall prepares to board the Clipper, as he is leaving the service. Then news arrives about the Japanese air attack on Pearl Harbor. The island goes on alert. Randall is unsure what to do. He is sent to a bomb shelter with the civilians as enemy planes approach. The Americans have only four fighters in the air, holding eight in reserve, against 24 Japanese bombers. Marine fighters shoot down several Japanese planes, but the bombers inflict heavy damage. Following the raid, Caton tells Randall he is no longer a civilian. McClosky decides to stay and dig trenches and other shelters with his heavy equipment. That night, Caton informs pilot Lieutenant Bruce Cameron that his wife was killed at Pearl Harbor.

The next day, enemy ships approach. The Marines camouflage their equipment. Caton orders his men into shelters and to hold their fire while the Japanese bombard the island. The Japanese signal the Americans to surrender. Caton does not answer. He waits until the enemy ships have closed to 4700 yards before returning fire, repelling the landing attempt and sinking several ships.

Cameron, on a reconnaissance flight, spots a Japanese heavy cruiser which can hit the island while remaining out of range of the defenders' weapons. He states he can take out that ship if his fighter is stripped down and carries only 15 gallons of fuel and a double load of bombs. Caton approves the mission. After successfully bombing the ship, Cameron is wounded by a Japanese fighter. He manages to land his airplane safely before dying.

Japanese planes bomb the island repeatedly.

Caton asks Captain Lewis to board a U.S. Navy patrol plane that is coming in, since he could provide intelligence to the U.S. Navy Department in Honolulu. Lewis refuses, but Caton orders him to go and file his official report.

Later, Caton is informed that the largest-caliber ammunition is running out, so he has smaller guns spread around, and repositions his available men. Japanese planes approach in large numbers, causing major damage and inflicting numerous casualties. Only one pilot is left, Captain Patrick. When his plane is damaged, he bails out, but is killed while parachuting down.

The Japanese again signal for surrender. Caton replies, "Come and get us." Eventually, Caton orders all posts to act independently. Communications fail. Caton orders the last man out of his command post with a written message, as McClosky walks in, asking for a weapon. They make their way to an abandoned machine-gun position. Caton mans the gun. The Japanese land and overrun the American positions. The main characters are all killed in action. Made in 1942, at the beginning of American entry into World War II, shortly after the battle itself, the film ends with a voiceover stating that "This is not the end."

Cast
 Brian Donlevy as Major Geoffrey Caton
 Macdonald Carey as Lieutenant Bruce Cameron
 Robert Preston as Private Joe Doyle
 William Bendix as Private Aloysius K. Randall
 Albert Dekker as Shad McClosky
 Walter Abel as Commander Roberts
 Mikhail Rasumny as Ivan Probenzky
 Rod Cameron as Captain Pete Lewis
 Bill Goodwin as Sergeant Higbee
 Damian O'Flynn as Captain Bill Patrick
 Frank Albertson as Johnny Rudd
 Philip Van Zandt as Cpl. Gus Goebbels (uncredited)
 Uncredited actors include Filipino Hollywood actor Rudy Robles as Triunfo, James Brown as a wounded marine, Barbara Britton as Sally Cameron, and Patti McCarty as a girl at the inn.  Chuck Connors is sometimes erroneously credited as a soldier in the meal line, but Connors was not in California during production, being at that time a full-time player for the Norfolk Tars, a baseball team in the minor league Piedmont League .

Production
The film was based on official Marine records and a copy of the script by W. R. Burnett and Frank Butler was sent to the marines for approval prior to filming.

Director John Farrow had recently returned to Hollywood after being invalided out of the Canadian Navy. He was signed to make the film by Buddy DeSylva of Paramount who liked Farrow's 1939 film Five Came Back. Farrow had visited Wake Island during his pre-Hollywood sailing days.

Filming started 23 March 1942. Most of the Japanese were played by Filipinos.

A special weapons detail of selected Marines from Camp Elliott, near San Diego, manned machine guns in land battle scenes. Marine crews were also used as extras and to operate equipment.

Three main locations were used. Most exteriors were shot in the Salton Sea in the California desert; filming took place here for three weeks at Sandy Beach which resembled Wake Island. The aerial battles were filmed at the Great Salt Lake in Utah. The big guns were fired at a coastal firing range near San Diego.

The film was a fictional account with Brian Donlevy's character being based on Major James P. S. Devereux, commander of the 1st Defense Battalion detachment on Wake. MacDonald Carey's was based on Major Henry T. Elrod and Captain Frank Cunningham. Walter Abel played the naval commander who in real life was Commander Winfield S. Cunningham.

The film crew had to battle intense sand storms on Sand Island. Following the location shoot the main unit returned to Paramount Studio for three weeks of shooting, while the second unit remained at Salton Sea under Hal Walker to do bombing scenes.

After completing the film, Farrow signed a long-term contract with Paramount.

MacDonald Carey was so inspired by working on the film he went and joined the United States Marine Corps after filming ended.

Reception

Critical

The film received positive reviews from critics. Bosley Crowther of The New York Times called it "a film for which its makers deserve a sincere salute. Except for the use of fictional names and a very slight contrivance of plot, it might be a literal document of the manner in which the Wake detachment of Marines fought and died in the finest tradition of their tough and indomitable corps."

Variety agreed and called it "one of the most striking pictures of the year ... Never is there pandering to phoney flag-waving, always just a group of normal human beings who knew of no other course than fighting to the end."

Harrison's Reports called it "Thrilling ... The realism of the Japanese attacks, and the stout defense put up by the Marines, are spine-chilling battle scenes that hold one in constant suspense, even though one is aware of the final outcome." Film Daily called it a "Stirring epic which will thrill the nation."

Wake Island placed fourth on Film Daily'''s year-end nationwide poll of 592 critics selecting the best films of 1942.

Awards
At the 15th Academy Awards on March 4, 1943, Wake Island was nominated for Outstanding Motion Picture, Best Director (John Farrow), Best Actor in a Supporting Role (William Bendix), and Original Screenplay (W.R. Burnett and Frank Butler). John Farrow won the New York Film Critics' Award for Best Director.

Box office
In addition to the critical acclaim, it was also one of the biggest box office hits of the year.

A radio play drama version featuring many of the same film actors was broadcast October 26, 1942 on the Lux Radio Theatre'', hosted by Cecil B. DeMille on the CBS radio network.

References

External links

 
 
 
 
 
 Rotten Tomatoes

1942 films
1940s war films
American World War II propaganda films
American black-and-white films
Films about the United States Navy in World War II
Pacific War films
World War II aviation films
World War II films made in wartime
Films scored by David Buttolph
Films set in 1941
Films set in Oceania
Films set in insular areas of the United States
Films set on islands
Films shot in California
Paramount Pictures films
Films directed by John Farrow
Films about the United States Marine Corps
Battle of Wake Island
American war films